Jo Grady (born 7 April 1984) is a senior lecturer in Employment Relations at The University of Sheffield, and a British trade union leader who serves as the general secretary of the University and College Union (UCU).

Biography
Grady was born in Wakefield in 1984, while her father was part of the UK miners' strike. She studied at Wakefield College, a further education institution, and then became the first member of her family to attend university, studying industrial relations at Lancaster University. Grady completed a PhD on trade union responses to neoliberal pensions reforms at Lancaster in 2011. In 2009, she began working as a lecturer in Trade Union Studies at the University of Leicester.

Grady joined the University and College Union (UCU) in 2006, and became joint secretary of its University of Leicester branch in 2016.  She then moved to work at the University of Sheffield, and became active in the UCU branch there, as its pensions officer. In 2018, she was elected to the union's national dispute committee for the Universities Superannuation Scheme, and she enthusiastically supported the union's strike that year over cuts to the scheme. In 2019 she was elected to the union's National Executive Committee.

The General Secretary of UCU, Sally Hunt, stood down in February 2019, and Grady ran in the resulting election.  Her campaign was noted for its strong online presence, and prominent badges and posters.  She defeated Jo McNeill and Matt Waddup, taking 64% of the vote in the final round of voting.

References

1984 births
Living people
Academics of the University of Leicester
Academics of the University of Sheffield
Alumni of Lancaster University
Trade unionists from Yorkshire
General secretaries of British trade unions
People from Wakefield